WHJY (94.1 FM) is a commercial mainstream rock iHeartRadio station in Providence, Rhode Island. WHJY has been a rock station since September 4, 1981.

Its broadcast center, also used by its sister stations, is on Oxford Street, just west of Interstate 95 in Providence, and its transmitter is located on Eastern Avenue in East Providence. (The station's studios are located on the northeast corner of the building, facing I-95, and are sometimes referred to by DJs as "the Ghetto Penthouse.")

History
WHJY signed on March 14, 1966, as WHIM-FM, simulcasting 1110/WHIM, a country music station.  The WHIM simulcast lasted through the 1970s until the FM station broke with the AM and became WHJY, "Joy 94", a beautiful music/easy listening station. On September 4, 1981, the station flipped to album rock, branded as "94 HJY". David Place, the actual radio DJ on the air when the format switched, began with Bob Seger's "The Fire Down Below."

WHJY and The Station Night Club Fire

WHJY was not the sponsor of the Great White concert at the Station Night Club in West Warwick, Rhode Island on February 20, 2003, but they promoted the event with DJ Michael "The Doctor" Gonsalves as emcee. A pyrotechnics display triggered a massive fire, killing Gonsalves and 99 other people and destroying the club. In Gonsalves' memory, the radio station has set up "The Doc Fund," a scholarship with Rhode Island College (his alma mater) to support the victims and families of those affected who attend the school.

Technical
WHJY transmits a 50,000-watt signal from a 550-foot tower (456 feet height above average terrain) at the end of Eastern Avenue in East Providence, Rhode Island. WHJY and WLVO are combined into an Electronics Research Inc. (ERI) SHPX-4BC, 4-bay FM antenna at the top of the tower. The tower is also used as part of the WPMZ (formerly WHIM) AM array, which has a skirt on the tall FM tower, and a shorter, second tower, at the same location. WHJY had been transmitting an HD Radio digital signal from this transmitter site as well, from between 2006 through the early 2010s, before ultimately ceasing HD digital transmissions. WHJY no longer transmits in HD digital. Their HD digital signal has been shut off and now the station transmits exclusively in analog stereo FM once again.

WHJY-HD2
Previously, WHJY-HD2 had aired iHeartMedia's "The Alternative Project" (from between 2006 through the early 2010s).

References

External links
 

 FCC History Cards for WHJY

HJY
Mainstream rock radio stations in the United States
Radio stations established in 1966
1966 establishments in Rhode Island
IHeartMedia radio stations